Chuar Butte is a prominent  summit located in the Grand Canyon, in Coconino County of northern Arizona, US. It is situated 1.5 miles northwest of Cape Solitude on the canyon's East Rim, three miles southeast of Gunther Castle, and immediately west of the confluence of the Colorado River and Little Colorado River. This position also places it where Marble Canyon ends, and the Grand Canyon begins. According to the Köppen climate classification system, Chuar Butte is located in a cold semi-arid climate zone.

History
Chuar Butte was named by John Wesley Powell for Chuarrumpeak, or Chuar-ru-um-pik, a young Kaibabits tribal chief who assisted Powell and was known among early settlers as "Chuar" for short. A variant name for this butte is Chuarooum Peak. This feature's name was officially adopted in 1906 by the U.S. Board on Geographic Names.

Chuar Butte and adjacent Temple Butte are the historical site of wreckage from the 1956 Grand Canyon mid-air collision, in which two commercial airliners collided, resulting in the deaths of all 128 on board both planes. This disaster was a catalyst that forced the government to overhaul airline regulation and to establish the Federal Aviation Administration. The site was designated a National Historic Landmark on April 22, 2014, and is in a remote area of the canyon that is only accessible to hikers.

Geology

The top of Chuar Butte is composed of Permian Kaibab Limestone, which overlays cream-colored, cliff-forming, Permian Coconino Sandstone. The sandstone, which is the third-youngest of the strata in the Grand Canyon, was deposited 265 million years ago as sand dunes. Below the Coconino Sandstone is reddish, slope-forming, Permian Hermit Formation, which in turn overlays the Pennsylvanian-Permian Supai Group. Further down are strata of Mississippian Redwall Limestone, and finally Cambrian Tonto Group at river level. The Butte Fault is on the west side of Chuar Butte. Uplift along the fault has lifted the Neoproterozoic Chuar Group 3,000 feet relative to the limestone layer, exposing mudstone of the Chuar Group.

Gallery

See also
 Geology of the Grand Canyon area
 List of National Historic Landmarks in Arizona
 Nankoweap Mesa – (the third & north “butte” along the Butte Fault system)

References

External links 

 Weather forecast: National Weather Service

Grand Canyon
Landforms of Coconino County, Arizona
Mountains of Arizona
Mountains of Coconino County, Arizona
Colorado Plateau
Grand Canyon National Park
Buttes of Arizona
North American 2000 m summits